David Brooke  may refer to:
David Brooke-Taylor (1920–2000), English cricketer
David Brooke (politician) (–1560), Lord Chief Baron of the Exchequer
Sir David Brooke, 11th Baronet (1938–2012), of the Brooke baronets

See also
 David Brook (disambiguation)
David Brooks (disambiguation)
Brooke (surname)